Santiago is a comarca in the Galician Province of A Coruña. The overall population of this local region is 168,601 (2019).

Municipalities
Ames, Boqueixón, Brión, Santiago de Compostela, Teo, Val do Dubra and Vedra.

References 

Comarcas of the Province of A Coruña